Michael A. Marletta is an American biochemist.

He graduated from the State University of New York at Fredonia with an A.B. degree in biology and chemistry, and from the University of California, San Francisco with a Ph.D. degree in pharmaceutical chemistry, where he studied with George Kenyon. 
He was John G. Searle Professor of Medicinal Chemistry in the College of Pharmacy and Professor of Biological Chemistry at University of Michigan. In 2001, he moved to the University of California, Berkeley to assume roles as Aldo DeBenedictis Distinguished Professor of Chemistry and Professor of Biochemistry and Molecular Biology, and served as the chair of the Department of Chemistry from 2005 until 2010. 
He was a Howard Hughes Medical Institute Investigator. From January 2012 to August 2014, Marletta was president and CEO of The Scripps Research Institute in La Jolla, California, succeeding Richard Lerner.

Marletta is currently Ch and Annie Li Chair in the Molecular Biology of Diseases at the University of California, Berkeley. In 2009, Marletta helped Jennifer Doudna return to UC Berkeley after working a short stint at Genentech; Doudna would later win the 2020 Nobel Prize in Chemistry with Emmanuelle Charpentier for her work on CRISPR after returning to UC Berkeley from Genentech.

Awards
 2018 Honorary Doctor of Science, State University of New York
2016 Elected to the American Philosophical Society
2006 Elected to the National Academy of Sciences
2004 Harrison Howe Awardee 
1999 Elected to the Institute of Medicine
1995 MacArthur Fellows Program

Works
"Nitric-Oxide Synthase Assays", Oxygen radicals in biological systems, Editor Lester Packer, Elsevier, 1994, 
"Biochemistry of Soluble Guanulate Cyclase", CGMP: Generators, Effectors and Therapeutic Implications, Editors Harald H. H. W. Schmidt, Franz Hofmann, Johannes-Peter Stasch, Springer, 2009,

References

External links
Michael A. Marletta", Scientific Commons
The Marletta lab at UC Berkeley

American biochemists
University of California, San Francisco alumni
Howard Hughes Medical Investigators
State University of New York at Fredonia alumni
University of Michigan faculty
UC Berkeley College of Chemistry faculty
Living people
MacArthur Fellows
Scripps Research faculty
Year of birth missing (living people)
Members of the American Philosophical Society
Members of the National Academy of Medicine
Members of the United States National Academy of Sciences
Fellows of the American Academy of Arts and Sciences
Scientists from New York (state)